Aasha is a 1983 Indian Kannada film,  directed by  A. T. Raghu and produced by R. F. Manik Chand. The film stars Ambareesh, Arjun Sarja, Kumari Indira and Kalaranjini in the lead roles. The film has musical score by G. K. Venkatesh. Ambareesh went on to star in a 1991 movie with a similar storyline titled Garuda Dhwaja. The movie was remade in Hindi in 1984 as Meri Adalat starring Rajinikanth and in Malayalam in 1984 as Ivide Thudangunnu starring Mohanlal.

Cast

Ambareesh
Arjun Sarja
Kumari Indira
Kalaranjini
Charan Raj
Vijayakashi
Ravichandra
B. R. Prasanna Kumar
Vajramuni
Dinesh
Sundar Krishna Urs
Shashikala
Goodooru Mamatha
Ashwath Narayana
Sampangi
Shankara Swamy
Manjunath
Srinivas
Lakshman
Thoogudeepa Srinivas in Guest Appearance
Shakti Prasad in Guest Appearance

Soundtrack

References

External links
 

1983 films
1980s Kannada-language films
Films scored by G. K. Venkatesh
Kannada films remade in other languages